The Icarus Theatre Collective is a British theatre company located in London, England.

Collective Company
The Icarus Theatre Collective is a mid-scale theatre company that functions as a collective. A team of artists and managers run the company under the direction of the company founder, Max Lewendel. Many team members collaborate on varied tasks and responsibilities though each individual artist can pitch their own major project.

Company history
Formed in the winter of 2003/2004, the company started as a small, informal group of theatre professionals working in various sectors of the industry. 

In 2005 Icarus registered formally as a company and the Finborough Theatre commissioned them to produce a piece of new writing entitled "Albert's Boy" by Finborough writer-in-residence, James Graham. The show starred Tony Award winner Victor Spinetti.

After a break of 18 months, Icarus came back together to produce "The Lesson" by Eugène Ionesco which toured 37 venues across the country, transferred to Assembly Rooms at Hill Street Theatre for the duration of the Edinburgh Festival, and finally went to Romania.

In 2009 Icarus transferred their tour of Vincent in Brixton to three touring houses including the Yvonne Arnaud Theatre, Devonshire Park Theatre, and Theatre Royal Windsor. They also produced their first Shakespeare piece, a mid-scale tour of Othello using actor-musicians playing violins, violas, and cellos. Both these projects marked the beginning of their collaboration with Original Theatre Company with whom we later toured Journey’s End (Runner-Up, The Guide Awards, four stars in The Times, Manchester Evening News, and The Scotsman).

In 2010 the company began with new writing about a gay teenager in 1981 Northern Ireland, Rip Her to Shreds, and followed with over 100 performances of the second Shakespeare play, Hamlet, done in the style of Greek Chorus.

2011 was marked by the commencement of the company's Macbeth tour. In June 2012 the production was taken abroad to the Shakespeare Festival at the Globe in Neuss, Germany, which marked the end of the tour.

References 

Theatre companies in the United Kingdom